USS Porpoise (SP-4) was a patrol yacht acquired by the United States Navy in 1917 and returned to her owner on 27 January 1919. She was built in 1910 as Casilda by Oscar Anderson, South Norwalk, Connecticut for Stewart H. Elliott of Norwalk and acquired in 1914 by Ogden M. Reid of New York City and renamed Porpoise.

Her call sign in 1919: Love - Boy - Jig - Sail

References

Patrol vessels of the United States Navy
World War I patrol vessels of the United States